Olafur Skulason may refer to:
 Ólafur Skúlason, Icelandic bishop
 Ólafur Ingi Skúlason, Icelandic footballer